A music competition is a public event designed to identify and award outstanding musical ensembles, soloists, composers, conductors and musicologists. Pop music competitions are music competitions which are held to find pop starlets.  

Examples of music competitions in popular music include Open Mic UK, SoundWave Music Competition, All-Japan Band Association annual contest, the World Music Contest, Live and Unsigned, the Eurovision Song Contest, and American Idol.

History
European classical art music uses competitions to provide a public forum that identifies the strongest young players and helps them start their professional careers (see List of classical music competitions). Popular instrumental ensembles such as brass bands and school bands have also long relied on competitions and festivals to promote their musical genres and recognize high levels of achievement. In the recent decades, large competitions have also developed in the field of popular music to showcase performances by pop vocalists and rock bands (e.g. "Idol series" and "Battle of the Bands" events).

Examples
The music competitions with the largest audiences are widely televised events in the genre of popular music, such as the Eurovision Song Contest and American Idol. The Open Mic UK and Live and Unsigned contests in the United Kingdom each garner approximately 10,000 contestants annually, making them the largest contests in the region.

According to 2005 statistics, more than 650,000 visitors attend the World Music Contest (Kerkrade, the Netherlands), which has 19,000 contestants from over 30 countries, making it one of the largest competitions in Europe. The All-Japan Band Association annual contest appears to be the world's largest music competition in terms of the number of active contestants, with approximately 800,000 competing musicians in more than 14,000 bands. A competition which has recently hit the United Kingdom music scene is called SoundWave Music Competition. This competition allows for singers, bands and all acts of all genres a chance to play at the O2 Academy Leeds, Newcastle and Glasgow. SoundWave Music Competition is a high profile competition and the biggest music competition in Northern England and Scotland where entrants can win radio slots and recording within the best recording studios in the United Kingdom and Scotland.
One of the oldest music competitions in the world is the International Naumburg Competition, in New York, which had its first competition in 1926. In recent years, the largest music competition in terms of number of global genres represented appears to be Sharq Taronalari, an enormous festival sponsored by UNESCO and the government of Uzbekistan. Various online music competitions for young musicians are now gaining popularity, including Unsigned Only, which is a global music contest based in United States, and Machan Music, an open and ongoing music contest based in India. The Songwriters Resource Network organizes the annual Great American Song Contest which is open to songwriters and lyric writers internationally.

See also
 
Malta International Music Competitions, Valletta/Mdina, Malta
 List of classical music competitions
 ISANGYUN Competition
 Bakitone International
 Battle of the Bands
 Idols
 The X Factor
 The Voice
 Great American Song Contest

References